Montecreto is a comune (municipality) in the Province of Modena in the Italian region Emilia-Romagna, located about  southwest of Bologna and about  southwest of Modena.

Montecreto borders the following municipalities: Lama Mocogno, Pavullo nel Frignano, Riolunato, Sestola.

References

Cities and towns in Emilia-Romagna